Sir Richard Powle (1628 – 12 July 1678) of Shottesbrooke Park, Berkshire was an English lawyer and politician who sat in the House of Commons  from  1660 to 1678.

Powle was born at Shottesbrooke, the eldest son of Henry Powle, and his wife Katherine Herbert, daughter of Matthew Herbert of Monmouth, Monmouthshire and was baptised on 17 July 1628. His father was Sheriff for Berkshire in 1633  Powle matriculated at  Christ Church, Oxford on  16 December 1646, aged 18. In 1654 he was called to the bar at Lincoln's Inn.  He inherited Shottesbrooke Park from his father in 1646.

In 1660, Powle was elected Member of Parliament for Berkshire in the Convention Parliament. He was re-elected in 1661 for the Cavalier Parliament and sat until his death in 1678. He was created Knight of the Bath in 1661. From 1665 to 1671 he was master of the horse to the Duchess of York and in 1667 was commissioner  for regulating the Duke of York's household.
 
Powle died at the age of 49, and was buried in Shottesbrooke Church.

Powle married by 1673, Anne Crispe daughter of Sir Nicholas Crispe, 1st Baronet of Quex, Kent and had two sons. His brother Henry Powle was Speaker of the House of Commons of England from January 1689 to February 1689.

References

External links
Sir Richard Powle's tomb, St John the Baptist's Church, Shottesbrooke

1628 births
1678 deaths
People from Shottesbrooke
Original Fellows of the Royal Society
Alumni of Christ Church, Oxford
Members of the Parliament of England for Berkshire
17th-century English lawyers
English MPs 1660
English MPs 1661–1679
Knights of the Bath